The Fort Worth Elks Lodge 124, also known as Benevolent and Protective Order of Elks is an organization founded in 1901, and it is also the name of its five-story building with elements of Georgian Revival architecture and of Spanish Renaissance Revival architecture that was built during 1927–28.  It was purchased by the YWCA of Fort Worth and Tarrant County in 1954.

It was listed on the National Register of Historic Places in 1984.

See also

National Register of Historic Places listings in Tarrant County, Texas
Recorded Texas Historic Landmarks in Tarrant County

References

External links

a photo of Fort Worth Elks Lodge 124, at Flickr

National Register of Historic Places in Fort Worth, Texas
Colonial Revival architecture in Texas
Buildings and structures completed in 1927
Buildings and structures in Fort Worth, Texas
Elks buildings
YWCA buildings
Clubhouses in Texas
Clubhouses on the National Register of Historic Places in Texas
Recorded Texas Historic Landmarks